The Breaks is a 2016 American television hip-hop drama film that chronicles the life of three friends during the early 1990s hip-hop scene. The film stars Wood Harris, Mack Wilds, Afton Williamson, David Call and rapper Method Man. Inspired by journalist Dan Charnas' book "The Big Payback", The Breaks was written and directed by Seith Mann and executive produced by Mann, Charnas, and Maggie Malina, along with Susan Levison and Bill Flanagan.

The Breaks premiered on VH1 on January 4, 2016.

On February 16, 2016, VH1 picked up The Breaks to become a full television series.

Cast
Afton Williamson as Nikki Jones
Wood Harris as Barry Fouray
 Mack Wilds as Daryl “DeeVee” Van Putten, Jr.
 David Call as David Aaron
 Antoine Harris as Ahmed “Ahm” Harris
 Evan Handler as Juggy Aaron
 Russell Hornsby as Sampson King
 Method Man as Daryl Van Putten, Sr.
A-F-R-O as D-Rome
 Sinqua Walls as Terrance "Lil Ray" Baltimore

References

External links
 

2016 television films
2016 films
American drama television films
2010s English-language films
2010s coming-of-age drama films
American coming-of-age drama films
Films set in New York City
Films shot in New York City
2010s hip hop films
VH1 films
Television films as pilots
2010s American films